Embraer Phenom may refer to:

 Embraer Phenom 100, a 4-6 passenger very light jet aircraft
 Embraer Phenom 300, a 6-8 passenger light jet aircraft

Set index articles on vehicles